Heroes' Lorebook is an accessory for the Forgotten Realms campaign setting for the second edition of the Advanced Dungeons & Dragons fantasy role-playing game.

Contents
This book is an update of the 1989 Hall of Heroes supplement for the Forgotten Realms setting. This book profiles 61 of the setting's most eminent characters, with each entry providing complete game statistics, background information, and campaign notes, drawn from novels and game products published through the end of 1995. There are around 60 heroes detailed throughout the 160 pages, including characters such as Elminster, Laeral Silverhand and King Azoun Obarskyr IV. After the stats for each character, proficiencies, equipment, magical items, combat tactics, companions, enemies, appearance, personality, location, history, motivations, campaign uses and sources for further reading are discussed at length. After this, there are sections which detail the special magical items which the heroes possess, and specialist spells which are mentioned throughout the book.

The 160-page book features a two-page introduction, which explains that this book is an update and a revision of Hall of Heroes. The book compiles information from novels and other sources published through the end of 1995. The book describes 60 characters, each including an illustration, game statistics, suggestions for campaign uses, and a list of the sources consulted for each character's entry. The book's center 16-page section (pages 73–88) presents a series of color illustrations, many of which were created especially for this book, depicting nearly half of the characters described in the book in a variety of scenes. Character descriptions appear on pages 6–135, and include such notables as Alias, Arilyn Moonblade, Bruenor Battlehammer, Danilo Thann, Drizzt Do'Urden, Dragonbait, Elminster, Khelben "Blackstaff" Arunsun, Olive Ruskettle, Shandril Shessair, and Wulfgar. Supplemental material on pages 136-158 includes notes on the Chosen of Mystra, magical items and effects, special wizard spells, heroic groups (including the Harpers and the Knights of Myth Drannor), and an index to the book. A list of sources mentioned throughout the book can be found on pages 159 and 160.

Publication history
The book, with product code TSR 9525, was published in 1996, and was written by Dale Donovan and Paul Culotta, with cover art by Doug Beckmann and interior art by Jordi Torres, Ned Dameron, Tony Crnkovich, and Valerie Valusek.

Reception
Paul Pettengale reviewed Heroes' Lorebook for Arcane magazine, rating it a 5 out of 10 overall. He stated that because the Forgotten Realms campaign is the most popular setting and has been around for so long, "and there have been so many novels written off the back of it, there are a huge number of heroes wandering the Realms. TSR has now gone about the herculean effort of cataloguing the lot and giving them stats, belongings and character summaries." Pettengale concluded the review by saying, "Although this is a highly polished collection of characters, and the background detail is interesting for any fan of Forgotten Realms, one has to wonder at the actual use of it. If you were planning to introduce one of these ultra-powerful characters into your campaign, surely you could make up the stats yourself, and it's unlikely that you're ever going to use more than half a dozen of these characters. So, great in theory, but in practice I think it's a rather pointless exercise."

Rick Swan reviewed Heroes' Lorebook in brief for Dragon magazine #235 (November 1996). Swan commented on the usefulness of the book's content to players: "With so much history to digest, casual players may feel overwhelmed. But if you take the Realms seriously, and names like Alias and Drizzt Do'Urden make your pulse quicken, welcome to nirvana."

References

Forgotten Realms sourcebooks
Role-playing game supplements introduced in 1996